The Faculty for Interdisciplinary Research and Continuing Education (IFF) is one of four Faculties at the University of Klagenfurt.

The founding principle of the IFF is to link scholarship to contemporary social issues and problems. Reflecting this, the Faculty’s structure is built around the social field of the research rather than in line with individual scientific disciplines. Research work is focussed on questions concerning societies’ relationship with public goods such as health, environment, spatial resources, technology, education, science, politics and culture at large.

Research, teaching and continuing education at the IFF pursue dual aims – one of which is social and the other scholarly. Interdisciplinarity and transdisciplinarity form the basis of both the theory and practice of the IFF’s research concept. This means that researchers from various disciplines, experts and actors from various professional fields work together in interdisciplinary and transdisciplinary projects and research areas focussing, among others, upon social, historical and systems science contexts. The projects are intervention-oriented. To intervene successfully, an understanding of the system- and organisational aspects of the problem is of central importance. Work undertaken by the Faculty therefore focuses upon encouraging well-reflected decision-making both in an individual and collective context. Concrete social problems and issues are addressed.

The IFF contributes to the solution of problems facing societies on one hand through research and teaching and on the other through consulting, intervention and extramural continuing education activities.

History 
IFF was founded in 1979 as the ‘Interuniversity Research Institute for Distance Education’ (in German: ‘Interuniversitäres Forschungsinstitut für Fernstudien’ or ‘IFF’). Since that time, the IFF has undergone several transformations. On one hand, the institute’s character has been altered by its growth during that period, and on the other hand, changes have taken account of evolving developments in higher education policy and the need for the Faculty to adapt to these.

IFF was founded as an inter-university institute with the aim of creating connections both between and across disciplines. During the founding years, the guiding vision involved “allowing research and education to have an impact ‘beyond’ the traditional universities”. The ‘Interuniversity Research Institute for Distance Education (IFF)’ was founded jointly by eight universities. In 1988, the IFF had premises in Klagenfurt, Bregenz, Graz, St. Pölten, Stadtschlaining and Vienna. Ten years later, the IFF was serving more than 1,000 distance learning students via study centres in Klagenfurt, Bregenz and Vienna. In addition, the IFF developed new courses for Austria-wide teacher training programmes and began to establish its own research foci, centred on themes such as the environment, peace studies, social learning, regional development or technology and scientific research.

In 1989 a conflict arose between the institute and the Austrian Federal Ministry of Science, concerning the direction taken by the IFF and its future development. The crisis was brought to an end with the re-establishment of the IFF in 1992 as the "Interuniversity Institute for Interdisciplinary Research and Continuing Education".

In the context of Austria’s university reform programme in 2002, the closure of all existing inter-university institutes in Austria was planned. This confronted the IFF with a choice between dissolution, with its existing regional facilities and their departments joining the nearest of the founding universities, or to remain a unitary institution and attach itself as a whole – with all regional centres – to one university. After internal discussions and negotiations with the rectors of the universities concerned, it was decided that the institute should remain intact. In 2004, the IFF was incorporated within the University of Klagenfurt as the ‘Faculty for Interdisciplinary Research and Continuing Education (Klagenfurt-Graz-Vienna)’ – in German the ‘Fakultät für Interdisziplinäre Forschung und Fortbildung’ and therefore the ‘IFF’. Interuniversity cooperation continued via contracts between the University of Klagenfurt and other universities.

In 2018, due to a major reorganization process, the departments in Vienna and Graz were transferred to BOKU, TU Graz, University of Vienna and University of Graz.

IFF staff 
Faculty staff are not only drawn from different academic disciplines but also work at the IFF in very different contexts such as palliative care, organisational ethics, social ecology and environmental history, organisational development, science and technology studies, group dynamics, school development, higher education research, agricultural and regional development, continuing education, and intervention research.

The Faculty’s inter- and transdisciplinary working approach ensures that academic personnel represent a broad spectrum of specialist expertise in scientific research, from the arts, humanities and cultural studies to natural sciences, engineering, social sciences and economics. Experts from a very wide range of professional fields who undertake research with the Faculty further strengthen the inter- and transdisciplinary  profile of the IFF.

Formerly, there were c. 80 university positions held at the IFF (in some cases these posts were shared between two persons). In addition, there were c. 60 independently funded individuals working at the IFF. A large number of external teaching staff was involved in teaching and continuing education programmes of the Faculty.

Management und Staff Involvement 
At the IFF, the Dean or Vice-Dean is responsible for the management of the Faculty. They are supported in their managerial function by conferences involving the heads of the individual organisational units. Faculty and staff are actively involved in developing Institute policies. To that end, twice-yearly Faculty meetings, involving all scientific and administrative staff members are held. These meetings focus on strategic discussion and the evaluation of units or projects as well as on internal networking.

Departments and Institutes 
The following departments are established in Klagenfurt:
 Instructional and School Development
 Science and Technology Studies
 Science Communication and Higher Education Research

Social Ecology is a department of BOKU in Vienna since 2018.

Bibliography 
 Jutta Menschik-Bendele (Ed.): Wissen schaffen. Die Forschung an der Alpen-Adria-Universität Klagenfurt., facultas.wuv Universitätsverlag, Vienna, 2010 
 Markus Arnold (Ed.): iff. Interdisziplinäre Wissenschaft im Wandel. LIT Verlag, Vienna, 2009

References

External links 
 Homepage of the Faculty for Interdisciplinary Research and Continuing Education

University of Klagenfurt